Harold Nichols (born November 26, 1967) is an American football coach and former player.  He was the head football coach at Presbyterian College in Clinton, South Carolina from 2009 to 2016.  Nichols played college football as a quarterback at Presbyterian from 1987 to 1989.  He has worked an assistant football coach at Georgia Southern University, the University of Rhode Island, Bucknell University, and his alma mater, Presbyterian.

Playing career
Nichols played quarterback for head coach Elliott Poss at Presbyterian College before graduating in 1989 as a political science major.  He threw for 3,688 yards in his three seasons as Blue Hose quarterback.

Coaching career
Nichols was an assistant at PC for quarterbacks and running backs in his first two years as a collegiate coach under head coach John Perry.  Then he spent five years as an assistant coach and recruiting coordinator at I-AA powerhouse Georgia Southern University.  In 1997, he began a three-year stay back at Presbyterian as wide receivers coach and recruiting coordinator for head coach Daryl Dickey.  In 2000, he began an eight-year run as associate head coach and offensive coordinator at the University of Rhode Island.  He then spent a season as offensive coordinator at Bucknell University before getting his first crack at being a head coach after 18 years as an assistant.

On January 14, 2009, Nichols was hired as head football coach of the Blue Hose, succeeding Bobby Bentley.  He took over a team transitioning into NCAA Division I Football Championship Subdivision (FCS) as a member of the Big South Conference.  This was his third stint as a football coach at his alma mater.  He resigned on November 20, 2016, a day after the team's ninth regular season loss and after eight seasons at the helm of the team, going 21–67.

Head coaching record

References

1967 births
Living people
American football quarterbacks
Bucknell Bison football coaches
Georgia Southern Eagles football coaches
Rhode Island Rams football coaches
Presbyterian Blue Hose football coaches
Presbyterian Blue Hose football players
People from New Smyrna Beach, Florida